Ubiquitin specific processing protease 37 is an enzyme that in humans, is encoded by the USP37 gene.

References

Further reading